USS Chattanooga was constructed during the final years of the American Civil War, but was not commissioned because the war was winding down in the Union’s favor. She was eventually placed into reserve until she was holed by ice in 1871.

History 

The first U.S. Navy ship to be so named, was built in  Philadelphia, a screw steamer, was launched 13 October 1864 by William Cramp & Sons, and completed by the Philadelphia Navy Yard. Commissioned on 16 May 1866 with Captain J. P. McKinstry in command. The ship was named after the city of Chattanooga, Tennessee. After sea trials in August 1866, Chattanooga returned to the Philadelphia Navy Yard where she was decommissioned 3 September 1866. She remained inactive there and at League Island, where in December 1871 she was holed and sunk at her dock by floating ice. The hulk was sold in January 1872.

See also

List of steam frigates of the United States Navy
Union Navy
Confederate States Navy
Bibliography of American Civil War naval history

References
 

Ships of the Union Navy
Steamships of the United States Navy
Ships built by William Cramp & Sons
1864 ships
Shipwrecks of the Pennsylvania coast
Maritime incidents in December 1871